Bekobod ( formerly Begovat) is a district-level city in Tashkent Region, eastern Uzbekistan. It lies along both banks of the Syr Darya River near Uzbekistan's border with Tajikistan.

Bekobod originally arose in connection with a cement plant. It received the status of a city in 1945. Until 1964, the city was known as Begovat.

Bekobod underwent rapid industrialization during the Soviet era. It has retained some of its industrial importance. Bekobod is home to a large steel mill and a cement factory. The Farkhad Dam and Farkhad Hydroelectric Plant lie just upstream from the city.

History 
Bekobod originally arose in connection with a cement plant. In 1942–44, a steel plant was constructed in the town. In 1943–48, the Farkhad Dam and Farkhad Hydroelectric Plant were built near Bekobod. The latter is a major source of electricity and irrigation water for Uzbekistan.

Bekobod received city status in 1945. Until 1964, the city was known as Begovat.

Geography 
Bekobod lies along both banks of the Syr Darya River near Uzbekistan's border with Tajikistan. There are mountains to the northeast and southeast of the city.

Climate 
Bekobod has a hot-summer Mediterranean climate (Köppen climate classification Csa) with continental influences. It has cold winters and hot summers. Sometimes the average June–July temperature reaches .

Demographics 
In 2021, Bekobod had a population of 96,900. Representatives of many ethnic groups can be found in the city. Uzbeks are the largest ethnic group.

Economy 
Bekobod remains an important industrial city in independent Uzbekistan. It is home to a large steel mill and a cement factory. There is also a brick factory, a meat-packing plant, a cotton plant, and many small and medium enterprises. The Farkhad Dam and Farkhad Hydroelectric Plant lie just upstream from the city.

Education 
Bekobod is home to a medical institute and a vocational school. There are also 17 secondary schools, two music schools, and one sports school in the city.

References

External links 
 Official website 
 A photo galley of Bekobod 

Cities and towns built in the Soviet Union
Cities in Uzbekistan
Populated places in Tashkent Region